Matthew Taylor (born 12 November 1993) is an Irish Gaelic footballer who plays for Cork Senior Championship club Mallow and at inter-county level with the Cork senior football team. He usually lines out as a right corner-forward.

Honours

Mallow
Cork Senior A Football Championship (1) 2021
Cork Premier Intermediate Football Championship (1): 2017

References

External links
Mattie Taylor profile at the Cork GAA website

1993 births
Living people
CIT Gaelic footballers
Mallow Gaelic footballers
Cork inter-county Gaelic footballers